In lean manufacturing, machine operator efficiency (MOE) is the performance of an employee who operates industrial machinery. The operator's efficiency is measured as the time spent producing product divided by the time the operator is on duty. For example: if an operator is assigned to run a CNC machine tool for seven hours, but they only have four hours' worth of continuous uninterrupted output of workpieces—their MOE rating is 57% (4 divided by 7) for this seven-hour period of time.

There is a similar lean manufacturing KPI called overall equipment effectiveness (OEE). The major difference between OEE and MOE is that the OEE rating is on the machine and the MOE is on the person.

MOE is a measure of operator performance only, regardless of the type of machine or the speed of the machine they are working on. MOE only measures the operator's ability to keep the machine running continuously (load and unload parts faster that the automatic cycle time of the machine). The MOE rating of an operator will travel with them as they moves from one machine to another. This is easily accomplished because the MOE rating is a universal calculation of time and not reliant on the complex OEE calculations of loading, availability, performance, and quality.

Industrial dashboards can be used to display statistics for MOE ratings on each operator. To boost overall profitability for a manufacturing plant, machine operators are sometimes compensated with a salary bonus based on their MOE ratings.

References

Lean manufacturing